Rebekah Kolstad (born January 21, 1997), also known by the Chinese name Li Beika, is an American ice hockey forward and member of the Chinese women's national ice hockey team, currently playing in the Zhenskaya Hockey League (ZhHL) with the KRS Vanke Rays. 

Kolstad represented China in the women's ice hockey tournament at the 2022 Winter Olympics in Beijing.

Playing career
Kolstad began her college ice hockey career with the North Dakota Fighting Hawks women's ice hockey program in the Western Collegiate Hockey Association (WCHA) conference of the NCAA Division I in the 2015–16 season. After the University of North Dakota abruptly ended its women's ice hockey program in the 2016–17 season, she joined the Minnesota State Mavericks women's ice hockey program in her hometown of Mankato, Minnesota for the 2017–18 and 2018–19 seasons. She started playing professional ice hockey in 2019, joining the KRS Vanke Rays. 

Kolstad was a member of the Chinese team at the 2022 Winter Olympics, where she recorded an assist in four games played.

References

External links
 
 

1997 births
Living people
American women's ice hockey forwards
Ice hockey players at the 2022 Winter Olympics
Ice hockey players from Minnesota
Minnesota State Mavericks women's ice hockey players
North Dakota Fighting Hawks women's ice hockey players
Olympic ice hockey players of China
People from Mankato, Minnesota
Shenzhen KRS Vanke Rays players
American expatriate ice hockey players in China

Minnesota State University, Mankato alumni